John Clarence Cudahy (December 10, 1887 – September 6, 1943) was an American real estate developer and diplomat. In the years leading up to World War II, Cudahy served as United States ambassador to Poland and Belgium, and as United States minister to Luxembourg and the Irish Free State.

Early life
Cudahy was born in Milwaukee, Wisconsin, the son of Anna (Madden) and Patrick Cudahy, a meat packing industrialist. He graduated from Harvard University in 1910 and from the University of Wisconsin Law School in 1913.

Cudahy served during World War I as a lieutenant in Company B of the U.S. Army's 339th Infantry Regiment. This regiment was part of the Polar Bear Expedition, which was sent to north Russia to intervene on behalf of the anti-communist forces in the Russian Civil War. On November 14, 1918, Cudahy led a counter-attack that succeeded in breaking through and routing the 1,000 Bolshevik troops that on November 11 (Armistice Day) had encircled and attacked the 600 American, Canadian, and Royal Scots soldiers who were holding the village of Tulgas on the Northern Dvina. However, his eventual disillusionment with the campaign in north Russia led him to write (under a pseudonym) the book Archangel: The American War with Russia.

Back in the United States, Cudahy headed his family's real estate company, building the Cudahy Tower Apartments on the shore of Lake Michigan in Milwaukee.

Diplomatic service
Between 1933 and 1940, Cudahy served the United States as minister to several European nations.

From September 6, 1933, until April 23, 1937, Cudahy served as the American ambassador to Poland. His time in Poland was marked by a militarily backed government under Józef Piłsudski and continued tensions between Poland and Nazi Germany under Adolf Hitler.

From August 23, 1937, Cudahy served as minister to the Irish Free State, which became the Republic of Ireland in December 1937. His official title was Envoy Extraordinary and Minister Plenipotentiary, and he served until January 15, 1940.

In January 1940, Cudahy became both the ambassador to Belgium and the minister to Luxembourg. He was forced to leave these posts after Germany occupied Luxembourg and Belgium in May 1940, and the nations set up governments-in-exile.  A close friend of King Leopold III, he publicly denounced Britain, France and the U.S. for a failure to plan an adequate defense. He became an embarrassment to Washington, which was officially neutral.

In 1941, Life magazine commissioned Cudahy to interview Hitler, which he did at Berghof. Cudahy later authored the book The Armies March, recounting his experiences in Europe leading up to the war, including the Battle of Belgium and his meeting with Hitler.

Death and descendants
Cudahy died in September 1943, when he was thrown from a horse on his Brown Deer estate north of Milwaukee. Cudahy's son, Michael Cudahy, founded Marquette Electronics and became a major philanthropist in the city of Milwaukee. Cudahy's daughter, Mary Keogh-Stringer (born Mary Toulgas Cudahy), was a successful artist; the dedication of The Armies March reads;

Works

References

Further reading
 Maga, Timothy P. "Diplomat among Kings: John Cudahy and Leopold III." Wisconsin Magazine of History 67.2 (1983): 82-98 online. 
 Spencer, Thomas, “Loyal Democrats John Cudahy, Jim Farley, and the Politics and Diplomacy of the New Deal Era, 1933–1941,” Wisconsin Magazine of History, 94 #1 (Spring 2011), 2–15.

External links

1887 births
1943 deaths
Harvard University alumni
University of Wisconsin Law School alumni
Writers from Milwaukee
American military personnel of the Russian Civil War
Ambassadors of the United States to Belgium
Ambassadors of the United States to Luxembourg
Ambassadors of the United States to Ireland
Ambassadors of the United States to Poland
Businesspeople from Milwaukee
Catholics from Wisconsin
Cudahy family
Military personnel from Wisconsin
United States Army personnel of World War I
United States Army officers